Varešanović is a surname. Notable people with the surname include:

Dal Varešanović (born 2001), Bosnian footballer
Hari Varešanović (born 1961), Bosnian musician
Mak Varešanović (born 1998), Bosnian footballer
Mirza Varešanović (born 1972), Bosnia and Herzegovina footballer and manager

Bosnian surnames